In British Malaya, a Queen's Scholar was a holder of one of various scholarships awarded by the Government of the Straits Settlements to further their studies in the United Kingdom.

The first scholarships, originally known as the Higher Scholarships, were founded in 1885 by Sir Cecil Clementi Smith, the Governor of the Straits Settlements, in honour of Queen Victoria. The main objectives of introducing Higher Scholarships was to allow promising boys an opportunity to complete their studies in the United Kingdom, and to encourage a number of boys to remain in school and acquire a useful education. From the period 1885–1890, Higher Scholarships were only awarded to the top boys in the Straits Settlement. Thereafter, the Higher Scholarships were renamed the Queen's Scholarships and was opened up to all British subjects of either sex. Recipients of the Queen's Scholarships would proceed to study at either Cambridge or Oxford universities.

The Queen's Scholarships were discontinued in 1911 but restored in 1931. In 1940, the selection of Queen's Scholars was transferred to a Board of Selection appointed by the Senate of Raffles College in Singapore. The Queen's Research Fellowships were also introduced for outstanding graduates of Raffles College and King Edward VII College of Medicine (later merged to form the University of Malaya) to study postgraduate courses in selected universities in the United Kingdom. In 1959, the Queen's Scholarship was replaced by the Agong's Scholarship in Malaysia and the Singapore State Scholarship, now the President's Scholarship in Singapore.

List of British Malayan Queen's Scholars 

 1886: Charles Spence Angus (Singapore), James Aitken (Singapore) 
 1887: Dr. Lim Boon Keng, P. V. S. Locke 
 1888: Sir Song Ong Siang (Singapore), Dunstan Alfred Aeria (Penang)
 1889: H. A. Scott
 1890: P. P. Mehergee, H. O. Robinson 
 1891: Francis Osmond de Souza (Singapore)
 1892: A. H, Keun, H. J.Phillips 
 1893: H. C. Keun, Ung Bok Hoey 
 1894: H. A. D. Moore, Koh Leap Teng 
 1895: J. C. J. de Silva 
 1896: Gnoh Lean Tuck (Wu Lien Teh) 
 1897: F. Salzmann, R. Holsington 
 1898: Quah Sin Keat, Phung Chock Kong 
 1899: Goh Lai Hee (Wu Lai Hsi), R. E. Smith 
 1900: W. S. Leicester, M. Foley 
 1901: Yeoh Guan Seok, R. H. McCleland, Chan Sze Pong 
 1902: Tan Seng Suan, Koh Keng Seng 
 1903: W. W. Davidson, W. J. G. McCain 
 1904: Lim Guan Cheng, Noel Clarke, Chan Sze Jin 
 1905: E. R. Carlos, R. L. Eber 
 1906: J. R. Aeria, L. Samy 
 1907: Khaw Oo Kek, C. H. Claude de Silva 
 1908: Leong Yew Koh (Perak)
 1909: Khoo Heng Kok, Stephen O. de Souza 
 1924: Teh Say Koo, Tan Ah Tah 
 1925: Yeoh Cheng Hoe 
 1926: Tan Yeow Bok, Oon Khye Beng 
 1927: Lim Kheng Kooi (Penang), Cheah Heng Sin 
 1928: J. W. D. Ambrose (Penang), Cheah Soon Hock 
 1929: Tan Thoon Lip, Ooi Tiang Eng 
 1930: Maggi Tan, Goh Liang Chuan 
 1931: Chuah Seng Chew, Liew Swee Cheng, Ong Hock Sim 
 1932: Tan Sim Eng, Thora Oehlers, R. Arulandum 
 1933:Keong Siew Tong, B. H. Y. Meggs, H. Jesudason 
 1934: A. V. Winslow, Dr. Lau Fook Khean, B. Ponniah (Seremban)
 1935: Cyril Noel L'Angellier, Ahmad bin Ibrahim, Ng Yok Hing, Mohd. Suffian bin Hashim 
 1936: Lim Hong Bee, Chia Kim Chwee, Ng Wah Hing, Rajah Zahar 
 1937: Emma Sadka/Emily Sadka, Lim Chong Eu, Chin Kim Hong, Ismail bin Md. Ali (K. Lumpur)
 1938: Lim Kok Aun, Lee Lian Chye, Yap Pow Meng, Abu Bakar bin Tamin 
 1939: Oliver Lyons Phipps (Penang), Wilbur Boswell (Singapore), Rodney Russell Lam (Kuala Lumpur)
 1940: Chung Shiu Tett (S), Dr. C. V. Jumeaux (F), Dr. Megat Khas bin Megar Omar (F), Maurice. E. Baker (C'Hlds S), D. R. E. S. Monteiro (F), Chuah Yew Cheng (F) 
 1941: Dr. Md. bin Mahomed (F), Dr. Wong Koon Yip/Wong Kin Yip/Wong Kim Yip (F) 
 1942: Dr. Irene Rajaratnam née Irene Hoisington (S), Kenneth Byrne (F), Dr. B. H. Sheares (F)
 1946: Dr. Suleiman bin Md. Attas (F), Chin Fung Kee (S), Abdul Kadir bin Shamsuddin (S), E. W. Barker (S) 
 1947: Dr. A. W. E. Moreira (F), Dr. Arthur A. Sandosham (F), Lim Ewe Hock (S), Kwa Geok Choo (S) 
 1948: Dr. Yahya Cohen (S), Chua Sui Eng (S) Kiang Ai Kim (F), Cheah Bian Kung (S), Dr. Abbas bin Haji Alias (F), Dr. Md. Din bin Ahmad (F)
 1949: Dr. Thong Saw Pak (Ipoh, S), Dr. Omar bin Din (Alor Star, S), Dr. Jaswant Singh Sodhy (Klang, F)
 1950: Chua Sui Eng (S), Lim Tay Boh (F), Dr. Abdul Majid bin Haji Ismail (S)
 1951: Francis Morsingh (Penang S), Aminuddin Baki (S), Gwee Ah Leng (S)
 1952: Wee Sip Chee/Wee Sit Chee (Singapore S), Un Hon Hin (Singapore S), Eunice Thio (Singapore S), Lim Joo Jock (S)
 1954: Chan  Kong Thoe (Penang)
 1955: Dr. Mrs. E. Hannam (S), Tan Kheng Choo (S), Hwang Peng Yuan (S)
 1956: Huang Hsing Hua (Seremban S), Ang Kok Peng (Taiping F), Mah Guan Kong (Singapore S), Colin Leicester (Singapore S)
 1957: Satwant Singh Dhaliwal (K. Lumpur S), Chatar Singh Data (Ipoh)

See also

References 

British Malaya
Education in Singapore
Education in Malaysia